Paul McCartney's Liverpool Oratorio is a live album by Paul McCartney and Carl Davis, released in 1991. It is McCartney's first major foray into classical music. Composed in collaboration with Carl Davis to commemorate the Royal Liverpool Philharmonic Orchestra's 150th anniversary, the project received media attention upon its unveiling in June 1991.

Recording
This recording was captured at the oratorio's dress rehearsal and premiere at Liverpool Cathedral with McCartney in attendance and features noted professional classical singers Kiri Te Kanawa, Jerry Hadley, Sally Burgess and Willard White re-enacting the roles in the oratorio. The recording was engineered by John Timperley.

Music and story
Consisting of eight movements, the story of the oratorio loosely follows McCartney's own lifeline, with the main character, Shanty, who is born in 1942 in Liverpool, raised to believe that "being born where you are born carries with it certain responsibilities". After his school days where he often "sagged off" (Liverpool slang for skipping class), Shanty begins working and meets his future bride, Mary Dee. Following the death of his father, Shanty and Mary Dee are married and are forced to deal with the rigours of balancing a happy marriage and their careers. Amid a quarrel, Mary Dee reveals that she is pregnant and after surviving a nearly fatal accident, gives birth to their son. Thus, the cycle of life in Liverpool carries on.

Reception

The commercial reaction for the work was strong, with the oratorio spending many weeks atop the classical charts worldwide, and even charting at number 177 in regular album chart in the US. Critical reaction was less positive, the virtually unanimous verdict being that the work, while attractive, was simplistic, overlong and, given its aspirations, insubstantial.

Track listing
All pieces by Paul McCartney and Carl Davis. The first four movements are on CD disc one, the second four on disc two.

Disc one
Side one – War
Andante (Orchestra) – 2:02
'Non Nobis Solum' – 2:35
'The Air Raid Siren Slices Through...' (Shanty) – 2:09
'Oh Will It All End Here?' (Shanty) – 1:36
'Mother and Father Holding Their Child' – 1:16

School
'We're Here in School Today to Get a Perfect Education' – 2:10
'Walk in Single File Out of the Classroom' (Headmaster) – 1:02
'Settle Down' – 0:40
'Kept in Confusion' (Shanty) – 2:35
'I'll Always Be Here' (Mary Dee) – 1:35
'Boys, This Is Your Teacher' (Headmaster, Miss Inkley) – 1:23
'Tres Conejos' (Miss Inkley, Headmaster, Shanty) – 1:50
'Not for Ourselves' (Headmaster, Miss Inkley, Shanty) – 0:55

Side two – Crypt
'And So It Was That I Had Grown' (Shanty) – 0:48
Dance – 1:44
'I Used to Come Here When This Place Was a Crypt' (Shanty, Preacher) – 1:58
'Here Now' (Shanty) – 0:46
'I'll Always Be Here' (Mary Dee, Shanty) – 2:24
'Now's the Time to Tell Him' (Mary Dee, Shanty) – 2:21

Father
Andante Lamentoso – 2:59
'O Father, You Have Given...' (Chief Mourner) – 1:05
'(Ah)' – 1:13
'Hey, Wait a Minute' (Shanty) – 1:44
'Father, Father, Father' (Shanty, Chief Mourner) – 4:12

Disc two
Side three – Wedding
Andante Amoroso – 'I Know I Should Be Glad of This' (Shanty, Mary Dee) – 5:42
'Father, Hear Our Humble Voices' (Preacher) – 1:13
'Hosanna, Hosanna' (Mary Dee, Shanty) – 1:40

Work
Allegro Energico – 1:20
'Working Women at the Top' (Mary Dee) – 2:52
Violin Solo – 5:05
'Did I Sign the Letter...' (Mary Dee) – 1:34
Tempo I – 0:30
'When You Ask a Working Man' (Shanty, Mr. Dingle) – 1:34
'Let's Find Ourselves a Little Hostelry' (Mr. Dingle) – 2:04

Side four – Crises
Allegro Molto – 0:54
'The World You're Coming Into' (Mary Dee) – 2:28
Tempo I – 0:45
'Where's My Dinner?' (Shanty, Mary Dee) – 2:40
'Let's Not Argue' (Shanty, Mary Dee) – 0:31
'I'm Not a Slave' (Mary Dee, Shanty) – 0:52
'Right! That's It!' (Mary Dee) – 0:49
'Stop. Wait.' – 2:03
'Do You Know Who You Are...' (Nurse) – 3:36
'Ghosts of the Past Left Behind' (Nurse, Shanty, Mary Dee) – 3:08
'Do We Live in a World...' (Mary Dee, Nurse, Shanty) – 3:18

Peace
'And So It Was That You Were Born' (Shanty) – 1:22
'God Is Good' – 1:26
'What People Want Is a Family Life' (Preacher) – 2:17
'Dad's in the Garden' (Nurse, Mary Dee, Preacher, Shanty) – 3:13
'So on and on the Story Goes' (Mary Dee, Shanty) – 1:06

Personnel
Royal Liverpool Philharmonic Orchestra – orchestra
Royal Liverpool Philharmonic Choir – chorus
Liverpool Cathedral Choiristers – chorus
Carl Davis – conductor
Ian Tracey – conductor
Kiri Te Kanawa – soprano : Mary Dee
Jerry Hadley – tenor : Shanty
Sally Burgess – mezzo-soprano : Miss Inkley, Chief Mourner, Nurse
Willard White – bass : Headmaster, Preacher, Mr Dingle
Jeremy Budd – treble : Boy Soloist

References

Oratorios
1991 live albums
1991 classical albums
Paul McCartney albums
Collaborations in classical music